The 2015 Georgia Tech Yellow Jackets baseball team represents Georgia Institute of Technology during the 2015 NCAA Division I baseball season. The Yellow Jackets play their home games at Russ Chandler Stadium as a member of the Atlantic Coast Conference. They are led by head coach Danny Hall, in his 22nd season at Georgia Tech.

Previous season
In 2014, the Yellow Jackets finished the season 5th in the ACC's Coastal Division with a record of 37–27, 14–16 in conference play. They qualified for the 2014 Atlantic Coast Conference baseball tournament, and, after going 2–1 in pool play, defeated Maryland in the championship game to win their 9th conference tournament championship as a member of the ACC. They qualified for the 2014 NCAA Division I baseball tournament as the automatic bid from the ACC, marking their 7th straight tournament appearance. They were placed in the Oxford Regional, along with Ole Miss, Washington, and Jacksonville State. The Yellow Jackets fell to the Huskies 0–8, but rebounded in their second game to defeat Jacksonville State, 4–2, in the loser's bracket. However, in their third game, a rematch with Washington, the Yellow Jackets were eliminated, losing 2–4.

Personnel

Roster

Coaching staff

Season

Preseason
Georgia Tech was originally scheduled to also face , but the game was cancelled due to impending cold weather. The Yellow Jackets opened their season on February 13 against regularly-scheduled opponent St. John's, and defeated the Red Storm, 17–3. Georgia Tech scored six runs in the first inning in the victory.

Schedule

! style="background:#272B65;color:white;"| Regular Season
|- valign="top" 

|- align="center" bgcolor=ccffcc
| February 13 || #29  || #26 || Russ Chandler Stadium • Atlanta, GA || 17–3 || King (1–0) || McCormick (0–1) ||  || 1,243 || 1–0 || –
|- align="center" bgcolor=ffbbb
| February 14 ||  || #26 || Russ Chandler Stadium • Atlanta, GA || 4–9 ||  ||  ||  ||  || 1–1  || —
|- align="center" bgcolor=ccffcc
| February 14 || Fordham || #26 || Russ Chandler Stadium • Atlanta, GA || 7–5 || #26 ||  ||  ||  || 2–1 || —
|- align="center" bgcolor=bbbbbb
| February 15 || at  || #26 || Russ Chandler Stadium • Atlanta, GA || colspan=7|Cancelled
|- align="center" bgcolor=ccffcc
| February 17 || at  || #28 || J. I. Clements Stadium • Statesboro, GA || 7–4 ||  ||  ||  ||  || 3–1 || —
|- align="center" bgcolor=ccffcc
| February 20 || vs.  || #28 || Springs Brooks Stadium • Conway, SC || 16–9 ||  ||  ||  ||  || 4–1 || —
|- align="center" bgcolor=ffbbb
| February 21 || at  || #28 || Springs Brooks Stadium • Conway, SC || 5–7 ||  ||  ||  ||  || 4–2 || —
|- align="center" bgcolor=ccffcc
| February 22 || vs.  || #28 || TicketReturn.com Field • Myrtle Beach, SC || 9–8 ||  ||  ||  ||  || 5–2 || —
|- align="center" bgcolor=ffbbb
| February 24 || at  || #27 || Plainsman Park • Auburn, AL || 1–7 ||  ||  ||  ||  || 5–3 || —
|- align="center" bgcolor=bbbbbb
| February 25 || Georgia State || #27 || Russ Chandler Stadium • Atlanta, GA || colspan=7|Cancelled
|- align="center" bgcolor=ccffcc
| February 27 ||  || #27 || Russ Chandler Stadium • Atlanta, GA || 1–0 ||  ||  ||  ||  || 6–3 || —
|- align="center" bgcolor=ccffcc
| February 28 || Indiana State || #27 || Russ Chandler Stadium • Atlanta, GA || 15–2 ||  ||  ||  ||  || 7–3 || —
|-

|- align="center" bgcolor=ccffcc
| March 1 || Indiana State || #27 || Russ Chandler Stadium • Atlanta, GA || 7–1 ||  ||  ||  ||  || 8–3 || —
|- align="center" bgcolor=ccffcc
| March 3 ||  || #28 || Russ Chandler Stadium • Atlanta, GA || 7–6 12||  ||  ||  ||  || 9–3 || —
|- align="center" bgcolor=ffbbb
| March 6 || #25 Notre Dame || #28 || Russ Chandler Stadium • Atlanta, GA || 2–3 10||  ||  ||  ||  || 9–4 || 0-1
|- align="center" bgcolor=ccffcc
| March 7 || #25 Notre Dame || #28 || Russ Chandler Stadium • Atlanta, GA || 11–7 ||  ||  ||  ||  || 10–4 || 1-1
|- align="center" bgcolor=ccffcc
| March 8 || #25 Notre Dame || #28 || Russ Chandler Stadium • Atlanta, GA || 4–1 ||  ||  ||  ||  || 11–4 || 2-1
|- align="center" bgcolor=ccffcc
| March 10 || Georgia Southern || #26 || Russ Chandler Stadium • Atlanta, GA || 22–6 ||  ||  ||  ||  || 12–4 || —
|- align="center" bgcolor=ccffcc
| March 13 || at Duke || #26 || Jack Coombs Field • Durham, NC || 5–2 ||  ||  ||  ||  || 13–4 || 3-1
|- align="center" bgcolor=ffbbb
| March 14 || at Duke || #26 || Jack Coombs Field • Durham, NC || 3–6 ||  ||  ||  ||  || 13–5 || 3-2
|- align="center" bgcolor=ccffcc
| March 15 || at Duke || #26 || Jack Coombs Field • Durham, NC || 4–0 ||  ||  ||  ||  || 14–5 || 4-2
|- align="center" bgcolor=ccffcc
| March 17 || at  ||  || Fred Stillwell Stadium • Kennesaw, GA || 7–6 11 ||  ||  ||  ||  || 15–5 || —
|- align="center" bgcolor=ffbbb
| March 20 || #27  ||  || Russ Chandler Stadium • Atlanta, GA || 3–5 ||  ||  ||  ||  || 15–6 || 4-3
|- align="center" bgcolor=ccffcc
| March 21 || #27 North Carolina ||  || Russ Chandler Stadium • Atlanta, GA || 6–5 ||  ||  ||  ||  || 16–6 || 5-3
|- align="center" bgcolor=ffbbb
| March 22 || #27 North Carolina ||  || Russ Chandler Stadium • Atlanta, GA || 1–5 ||  ||  ||  ||  || 16–7 || 5-4
|- align="center" bgcolor=ccffcc
| March 24 || Auburn || #28 || Russ Chandler Stadium • Atlanta, GA || 4–1 ||  ||  ||  ||  || 17–7 || —
|- align="center" bgcolor=ffbbb
| March 27 || at #11 Louisville || #28 || Jim Patterson Stadium • Louisville, KY || 1–4 ||  ||  ||  ||  || 17–8 || 5-5
|- align="center" bgcolor=ffbbb
| March 28 || at #11 Louisville || #28 || Jim Patterson Stadium • Louisville, KY || 3–8 ||  ||  ||  ||  || 17–9 || 5-6
|- align="center" bgcolor=ffbbb
| March 29 || at #11 Louisville || #28 || Jim Patterson Stadium • Louisville, KY || 1–4 ||  ||  ||  ||  || 17–10 || 5-7
|- align="center" bgcolor=ccffcc
| March 31 || at  ||  || Foley Field • Athens, GA || 13–6 ||  ||  ||  ||  || 18–10 || —
|-

|- align="center" bgcolor=ccffcc
| April 1 || at Georgia State ||  || GSU Baseball Complex • Decatur, GA || 6–3 ||  ||  ||  ||  || 19–10 || —
|- align="center" bgcolor=ccffcc
| April 3 || at Virginia Tech ||  || English Field • Blacksburg, VA || 11–5 ||  ||  ||  ||  || 20–10 || 6-7
|- align="center" bgcolor=ffbbb
| April 4 || at Virginia Tech ||  || English Field • Blacksburg, VA || 8–9 ||  ||  ||  ||  || 20–11 || 6-8
|- align="center" bgcolor=ccffcc
| April 5 || at Virginia Tech ||  || English Field • Blacksburg, VA || 7–6 ||  ||  ||  ||  || 21–11 || 7-8
|- align="center" bgcolor=ccffcc
| April 7 ||  ||  || Russ Chandler Stadium • Atlanta, GA || 4–3 ||  ||  ||  ||  || 22–11 || —
|- align="center" bgcolor=ffbbb
| April 10 || Virginia ||  || Russ Chandler Stadium • Atlanta, GA || 4–14 ||  ||  ||  ||  || 22–12 || 7-9
|- align="center" bgcolor=ccffcc
| April 11 || Virginia ||  || Russ Chandler Stadium • Atlanta, GA || 11–4 ||  ||  ||  ||  || 23–12 || 8-9
|- align="center" bgcolor=ccffcc
| April 12 || Virginia ||  || Russ Chandler Stadium • Atlanta, GA || 4–3 ||  ||  ||  ||  || 24–12 || 9-9
|- align="center" bgcolor=bbbbbb
| April 14 || Georgia ||  || Russ Chandler Stadium • Atlanta, GA || colspan=7|Cancelled
|- align="center" bgcolor=ffbbb
| April 17 || at Boston College || #24 || Pellagrini Diamond • Chestnut Hill, MA || 0–1 ||  ||  ||  ||  || 24–13 || 9-10
|- align="center" bgcolor=ffbbb
| April 18 || at Boston College || #24 || Pellagrini Diamond • Chestnut Hill, MA || 1–6 ||  ||  ||  ||  || 24–14 || 9-11
|- align="center" bgcolor=ffbbb
| April 19 || at Boston College || #24 || Pellagrini Diamond • Chestnut Hill, MA || 0–4 ||  ||  ||  ||  || 24–15 || 9-12
|- align="center" bgcolor=ffbbb
| April 21 || Kennesaw State ||  || Russ Chandler Stadium • Atlanta, GA || 6–11 ||  ||  ||  ||  || 24–16 || —
|- align="center" bgcolor=ccffcc
| April 24 || Clemson ||  || Russ Chandler Stadium • Atlanta, GA || 4–2 ||  ||  ||  ||  || 25–16 || 10-12
|- align="center" bgcolor=ffbbb
| April 25 || Clemson ||  || Russ Chandler Stadium • Atlanta, GA || 3–11 ||  ||  ||  ||  || 25–17 || 10-13
|- align="center" bgcolor=ccffcc
| April 26 || Clemson ||  || Russ Chandler Stadium • Atlanta, GA || 5–4 10||  ||  ||  ||  || 26–17 || 11-13
|-

|- align="center" bgcolor=ccffcc
| May 2 ||  ||  || Russ Chandler Stadium • Atlanta, GA || 5–1 ||  ||  ||  ||  || 27–17 || —
|- align="center" bgcolor=ccffcc
| May 2 || Presbyterian ||  || Russ Chandler Stadium • Atlanta, GA || 11–9 ||  ||  ||  ||  || 28–17 || —
|- align="center" bgcolor=ccffcc
| May 3 || Presbyterian ||  || Russ Chandler Stadium • Atlanta, GA || 10–2 ||  ||  ||  ||  || 29–17 || —
|- align="center" bgcolor=ccffcc
| May 6 || at Mercer ||  || Claude Smith Field • Macon, GA || 9–7 ||  ||  ||  ||  || 30–17 || —
|- align="center" bgcolor=ccffcc
| May 8 || Pittsburgh ||  || Russ Chandler Stadium • Atlanta, GA || 9–1 ||  ||  ||  ||  || 31–17 || 12-13
|- align="center" bgcolor=ffbbb
| May 9 || Pittsburgh ||  || Russ Chandler Stadium • Atlanta, GA || 6–8 ||  ||  ||  ||  || 31–18 || 12-14
|- align="center" bgcolor=ccffcc
| May 10 || Pittsburgh ||  || Russ Chandler Stadium • Atlanta, GA || 10–3 ||  ||  ||  ||  || 32–18 || 13-14
|- align="center" bgcolor=ffbbb
| May 12 || vs. Georgia ||  || Turner Field • Atlanta, GA || 0–6 ||  ||  ||  ||  || 32–19 || —
|- align="center" bgcolor=ffbbb
| May 14 || at #7 Miami (FL) ||  || Alex Rodriguez Park • Coral Gables, FL || 0–3 ||  ||  ||  ||  || 32–20 || 13-15
|- align="center" bgcolor=ffbbb
| May 15 || at #7 Miami (FL) ||  || Alex Rodriguez Park • Coral Gables, FL || 1–22 ||  ||  ||  ||  || 32–21 || 13-16
|- align="center" bgcolor=ffbbb
| May 16 || at #7 Miami (FL) ||  || Alex Rodriguez Park • Coral Gables, FL || 4–17 ||  ||  ||  ||  || 32–22 || 13-17
|-

|- 
! style="background:#272B65;color:white;"| Post-Season
|-

|- align="center" bgcolor=ffbbb
| May 19 || #29 Virginia || || Durham Bulls Athletic Park • Durham, NC || 0–11 7 (Mercy Rule)||  ||  ||  ||  || 32–23 || 0-1
|-

|-
| style="font-size:88%" | All rankings from Collegiate Baseball.

Rankings

References

Georgia Tech Yellow Jackets
Georgia Tech Yellow Jackets baseball seasons
Georgia Tech